Carlos Torres-Machado is an Ecuadorian visual artist. He is the current President of ArteLatAm, an arts organization dedicated to the support of Latin American visual artists. It has its headquarters in Queens, New York.

Personal life
Torres-Machado was born in Ecuador. Since a very young age, he expressed his love towards art and other disciplines of interest. In 2012, Torres-Machado moved to New York City to further develop his career as an artist. He lives together with his wife and kid in New York City.

Professional career
Carlos Torres-Machado graduated with a B.F.A. in Contemporary Arts, Communication, Photography, and Psychology from the Universidad Nacional de las Artes, and Universidad San Francisco de Quito. Ever since he moved to New York, he has held exhibitions in Europe, Latin America, and major international biennials. In 2017, he was awarded as the New York Regional winner of the Bombay Sapphire Artisan Series. Torres-Machado has experience as a photographer. His abstract artworks are mostly characterized by their variety of color and the use of geometrical language.

After succeeding in the Latin American art market of New York, Torres-Machado decided that it was highly important to share some of his success, and founded ArteLatAm. ArteLatAm is an arts organization that works towards increasing the visibility and recognition of Latin American visual artists worldwide by giving them the tools and skills necessary to thrive.

References

External links
https://www.torresmachado.com/
Interview: Carlos Torres-Machado, .itsliquid
Artist Spotlight: Carlos Torres-Machado
Carlos Torres-Machado Wins Bombay Sapphire Artisan Series Regional Competition
'Reinaré', en Brooklyn Art Space
Artista ecuatoriano Carlos Torres-Machado representará a NY en “Artisan Series”

Ecuadorian artists
Universidad San Francisco de Quito alumni
Living people
Year of birth missing (living people)